St. Paul Seminary may refer to:

St. Paul Seminary School of Divinity in Saint Paul, Minnesota
Saint Paul Seminary (Pittsburgh), Pennsylvania
Saint Paul Seminary (Saginaw) in Saginaw, Michigan (closed in 1970)
Minor seminary of Saint Paul Palembang, Indonesia

See also
List of Roman Catholic seminaries